The 1960 Minnesota Golden Gophers baseball team represented the University of Minnesota in the 1960 NCAA University Division baseball season. The Golden Gophers played their home games at Delta Field. The team was coached by Dick Siebert in his 13th season at Minnesota.

The Golden Gophers won the College World Series, defeating the USC Trojans in the championship game.

Roster

Schedule 

! style="background:#FFBC3A;color:#872434;"| Regular Season
|- valign="top" 

|- align="center" bgcolor="#ffdddd"
| March 21 || at  || 14–21 || 0–1 || –
|- align="center" bgcolor="#ffdddd"
| March 22 || at Texas || 7–13 || 0–2 || –
|- align="center" bgcolor="#ddffdd"
| March 23 || at  || 6–2 || 1–2 || –
|- align="center" bgcolor="#ddffdd"
| March 24 || at Sam Houston State || 9–5 || 2–2 || –
|- align="center" bgcolor="#ffdddd"
| March 24 || at Sam Houston State || 14–15 || 2–3 || –
|- align="center" bgcolor="#ffdddd"
| March 25 || at  || 4–5 || 2–4 || –
|- align="center" bgcolor="#ddffdd"
| March 26 || at Houston || 5–1 || 3–4 || –
|-

|- align="center" bgcolor="#ddffdd"
| April 1 || at  || 5–4 || 4–4 || –
|- align="center" bgcolor="#ddffdd"
| April 2 || at Iowa State || 4–1 || 5–4 || –
|- align="center" bgcolor="#ddffdd"
| April 2 || at Iowa State || 9–8 || 6–4 || –
|- align="center" bgcolor="#ddffdd"
| April 8 || at  || 8–4 || 7–4 || –
|- align="center" bgcolor="#ddffdd"
| April 9 || at  || 14–4 || 8–4 || –
|- align="center" bgcolor="#ddffdd"
| April 9 || at Luther || 2–0 || 9–4 || –
|- align="center" bgcolor="#ddffdd"
| April 15 || at  || 28–2 || 10–4 || –
|- align="center" bgcolor="#ddffdd"
| April 22 ||  || 1–0 || 11–4 || –
|- align="center" bgcolor="#ddffdd"
| April 22 || Northern Iowa || 13–1 || 12–4 || –
|- align="center" bgcolor="#ddffdd"
| April 23 || Northern Iowa || 13–0 || 13–4 || –
|- align="center" bgcolor="#ddffdd"
| April 23 || Northern Iowa || 13–1 || 14–4 || –
|- align="center" bgcolor="#ddffdd"
| April 29 ||  || 13–6 || 15–4 || 1–0
|- align="center" bgcolor="#ddffdd"
| April 30 ||  || 10–3 || 16–4 || 2–0
|- align="center" bgcolor="#ddffdd"
| April 30 || Michigan || 11–2 || 17–4 || 3–0
|-

|- align="center" bgcolor="#ddffdd"
| May 6 || at  || 8–6 || 18–4 || 4–0
|- align="center" bgcolor="#ddffdd"
| May 7 || at  || 4–2 || 19–4 || 5–0
|- align="center" bgcolor="#ffdddd"
| May 7 || at Indiana || 1–2 || 19–5 || 5–1
|- align="center" bgcolor="#ddffdd"
| May 13 ||  || 8–4 || 20–5 || 6–1
|- align="center" bgcolor="#ddffdd"
| May 14 ||  || 3–2 || 21–5 || 7–1
|- align="center" bgcolor="#ddffdd"
| May 14 || Northwestern || 4–2 || 22–5 || 8–1
|- align="center" bgcolor="#ddffdd"
| May 20 || at  || 9–1 || 23–5 || 9–1
|- align="center" bgcolor="#ddddff"
| May 21 || at  || 3–6 || 23–6 || 9–2
|- align="center" bgcolor="#ddddff"
| May 21 || at Purdue || 7–7 || 23–6–1 || 9–2–1
|- align="center" bgcolor="#ddffdd"
| May 27 ||  || 17–3 || 24–6–1 || 10–2–1
|- align="center" bgcolor="#ddffdd"
| May 28 || Iowa || 7–3 || 25–6–1 || 11–2–1
|- align="center" bgcolor="#ddffdd"
| May 28 || Iowa || 8–0 || 26–6–1 || 12–2–1
|-

|-
! style="background:#FFBC3A;color:#872434;"| Post-Season
|-
|-

|- align="center" bgcolor="#ddffdd"
| June 2 || vs.  || 15–6 || 27–6–1
|- align="center" bgcolor="#ddffdd"
| June 3 || vs.  || 12–5 || 28–6–1
|- align="center" bgcolor="#ddffdd"
| June 4 || vs. Detroit || 5–4 || 29–6–1
|-

|- align="center" bgcolor="ddffdd"
| June 14 || vs. North Carolina || Rosenblatt Stadium || 8–3 || 30–6–1
|- align="center" bgcolor="ddffdd"
| June 15 || vs. Arizona || Rosenblatt Stadium || 8–5 || 31–6–1
|- align="center" bgcolor="ddffdd"
| June 16 || vs. Southern California || Rosenblatt Stadium || 12–11 || 32–6–1
|- align="center" bgcolor="ddffdd"
| June 18 || vs. Oklahoma State || Rosenblatt Stadium || 3–1 || 33–6–1
|- align="center" bgcolor="ffdddd"
| June 19 || vs. Southern California || Rosenblatt Stadium || 3–4 || 33–7–1
|- align="center" bgcolor="ddffdd"
| June 20 || vs. Southern California || Rosenblatt Stadium || 2–1 || 34–7–1
|-

Awards and honors 
Larry Bertelsen
 All-America First Team
 All-Big Ten First Team

John Erickson
 College World Series Most Outstanding Player

Wayne Knapp
 All-American First Team
 All-Big Ten First Team

David Pflepsen
 All-Big Ten First Team
 All-College World Series Team

Howard Nathe
 All-Big Ten First Team

Carl Rolloff
 All-College World Series Team

Bob Wasko
 All-College World Series Team

References 

1960 Big Ten Conference baseball season
Minnesota Golden Gophers baseball seasons
College World Series seasons
NCAA Division I Baseball Championship seasons
Big Ten Conference baseball champion seasons
Minnesota Golden Gophers baseball